Karl Martin Lundén (1 January 1925 – 14 February 2011) was a Swedish swimmer who won the 4×200 m freestyle European title in 1947. He competed at the 1948 Summer Olympics in the 100 m backstroke and 100 m and 4×200 m freestyle events and finished fourth in the relay.

References

1925 births
2011 deaths
Swedish male freestyle swimmers
Swedish male backstroke swimmers
Olympic swimmers of Sweden
Swimmers at the 1948 Summer Olympics
European Aquatics Championships medalists in swimming
SK Neptun swimmers
20th-century Swedish people